Hannivka is an urban-type settlement in Brianka Municipality in Alchevsk Raion of Luhansk Oblast in eastern Ukraine. Population:

Demographics
Native language distribution as of the Ukrainian Census of 2001:
 Ukrainian: 89.42%
 Russian: 9.19%
 Others 0.28%

References

Urban-type settlements in Alchevsk Raion